Sharbari Zohra Ahmed is a Bangladeshi American writer. She is known for being a writer on the ABC thriller Quantico.

Early life
Sharbari Zohra Ahmed was born in Dhaka, Bangladesh. Her family fled Bangladesh when she was three weeks old due to the Bangladesh Liberation War, during which her father was targeted for execution by the Pakistani Army. She went to New York University for her master's degree in creative writing. She lived in Ethiopia for a while, her story "Pepsi" is set in Ethiopia and is about a daughter of a Bangladeshi diplomat trying to fit in the country.

Career
Ahmed was on the writing team for the first season of the ABC show Quantico, making her the first woman of Bangladeshi origin to write for a network show. She wrote a play, Raisins Not Virgins, which was adapted into a short film. Raisins Not Virgins was about being a young female American Muslim trying to make sense of her Islamic identity. She wrote the play in 2003 and adapted it for the stage. She produced the play and acted in it. In 2008, in the Tribeca Film Festival it was selected for the Tribeca All Access programme. Her book, The Ocean of Mrs. Nagai, was released at the Hay Festival Dhaka in 2013. She is on the faculty of the MFA program at Manhattanville College. She defended Indian actor, Soha Ali Khan, after she was criticised by Muslim extremists for wearing a sari, which the extremist deemed un-Islamic. She presented in the AWP conference on Post Colonial literature in Bangladesh in 2016. She is working on a new project called The Line with Ikhtisad Ahmed. Her fiction has appeared in numerous journals and anthologies including The Gettysburg Review, Painted Bride Quarterly and the Asian Pacific American Journal. In 2017, she adapted Rickshaw Girl by Mitali Bose Perkins (Scholastic) for the screen. The film is produced by Sleeperwave Films and directed by Amitabh Reza Chowdhury.

Bibliography
 The Ocean of Mrs. Nagai
 The New Anthem: A Subcontinent in its Own Words
 Lifelines

References

Living people
American people of Bangladeshi descent
Bangladeshi women writers
Bangladeshi writers
People from Dhaka
New York University alumni
Manhattanville College faculty
Year of birth missing (living people)